Juan Carlos Muñoz Márquez (born 30 April 1950) is a Mexican politician affiliated with the PAN. As of 2013 he served as Deputy of the LXII Legislature of the Mexican Congress representing Guanajuato.

References

1950 births
Living people
Politicians from Guanajuato
People from León, Guanajuato
National Action Party (Mexico) politicians
21st-century Mexican politicians
Deputies of the LXII Legislature of Mexico
Members of the Chamber of Deputies (Mexico) for Guanajuato